The First Unitarian Church of Chicago is a Unitarian Universalist ("UU") church in Chicago, Illinois. Unitarians do not have a common creed and include people with a wide variety of personal beliefs, and include atheists, agnostics, deists, monotheists, pantheists, polytheists, pagans, as well as other belief systems.

One of the oldest churches in Chicago, First Unitarian Chicago was founded July 29, 1836 and is currently located at 5650 S. Woodlawn Avenue. Its founding was in part the result of a small group of Chicago Unitarians with the minister Charles Follen.  Its first building was constructed in 1841 on what is now the site of the Picasso statue in Daley Plaza. The building, twice enlarged before it burned down, held the first church bell in Chicago placed there in January 1845.

In June 1862 the building was lost to fire, the congregation temporarily worshiped in St. Paul's Universalist Church until the new church building was completed and the first service was help November 22, 1863.

In 1873 a new church building was constructed at the corner of 23rd and Michigan. And in 1897 a mission chapel to the University of Chicago was built at 57th and Woodlawn in Hyde Park, Chicago. In 1909, the 23rd ave building was sold and the congregation moved to the university chapel.

A new edifice was built in 1925 in an English perpendicular Gothic style, a gift of church member and Illinois US Representative Morton D. Hull whose ashes now rest in the crypt below the building. A crypt for cinerary urns (a Columbarium) below the nave was the first crypt for ashes in the city. It was designed intentionally to serve the neighborhood and city, not just members of the church.

The 1931 building had a belltower featuring multiple floors, on top of which was added a steeple. The steeple was repaired in the 1990s, and removed in 2002 due to failing structure. This was not the first time the tower of a church building had incurred a cost to the society. After the Church of the Messiah was built in 1964, the tower on that building settled. As a result, it had to be taken down and entirely rebuilt along with the front of the church at a cost of $15,000.

In 1956, the Chicago Children's Choir was founded in the church by assistant minister Christopher Moore.

Notable members
 James Luther Adams
 Dolores Cross
 Bradford Lyttle
 Toni Preckwinkle
 Morton D. Hull (interred in the crypt)
 Hans Gustav Güterbock (interred in the crypt)
 Ralph Wendell Burhoe (interred in the crypt)
 Shailer Mathews (interred in the crypt)
 Frank Knight (interred in the crypt)
 Von Ogden Vogt (interred in the crypt)
 Curtis W. Reese (interred in the crypt)
 Horatio G. Loomis
 Ebenezer Peck
 John Charles Haines
 Y. C. Wong (interred in the crypt)

Senior ministers
 1839–1844.  Joseph Harrington Jr.
 1846–1849. William Adam (minister)
 1849–1857. Rush Rhees Shippen
 1857–1859. George F. Noyes
 1861–1864 Charles B. Thomas
 1866–1874. Robert Laird Collier
 1876–1881. Brooke Herford
 1883–1891. David Utter
 1891–1901. William Wallace Fenn
 1901–1923. William Hansen Pulsford
 1925–1944. Von Ogden Vogt
 1944–1962. Leslie T. Pennington
 1963–1968. Jack Kent
 1968–1969. John Robinson (interim)
 1969–1978. Jack Mendelsohn
 1980–1986. Duke Gray
 1988–1991. Tom Chulak
 1993–1998. Terasa Cooley
 1999–2011. Nina Grey
 2011–2013. Barbara Gadon (interim)
 2013–2021. Teresa and David Schwartz

Ministers-at-large
 1860–1863. Robert Collyer (minister-at-large)
           George Sikes  (minister-at-large)
 1977–present.  W. David Arksey (minister-at-large)

References

FURTHER READING

Alan Seaburg, The Unitarian Pope, Brooke Herford's Ministry in Chicago and Boston, 1876–1892, 2015

External links
 Official Website

Churches in Chicago
Unitarian Universalism in Illinois
19th-century Unitarian Universalist church buildings
Unitarian Universalist churches in Illinois
Religious organizations established in 1836
1836 establishments in Illinois
Gothic Revival architecture in Illinois
Hyde Park, Chicago